U.F.O. (also known as U.F.O. - The Movie) is a 1993 British science fiction spoof directed by Tony Dow and starring Roy Chubby Brown in the role of a blue comedian whose act offends a pair of female aliens, who proceed to kidnap him and put him on trial.

Plot
The infamous stand-up comic Roy Chubby Brown stars in this irreverent, science fiction spoof. Performing one night at the end of Blackpool Pier, Chubby is beamed up to a spaceship populated by feminist aliens. Put on trial for crimes against women and quickly found guilty, the unapologetic misogynist is condemned to become pregnant every year for the next thirty years.

Cast
 Roy Chubby Brown — himself
 Sara Stockbridge — Zoe
 Roger Lloyd-Pack — Solo
 Amanda Symonds  — Ava
 Shirley Anne Field — Judge
 Kenny Baker — Casanova
 Kiran Shah — Genghis Khan
 Rusty Goffe — King Henry VIII
 Antony Georghiou  — Count Dracula
 Ben Aris — Doctor Richard Head
 Paul Barber — The Doctor (voice)

Reception
It was reviewed poorly, with Empire calling the film "a stand-up show, allowing the comedian to tell his sexist jokes to a race of aliens who charge him for being a misogynist" and rating it 1/5.

The film opened on 45 screens on 10 December 1993 in the United Kingdom and grossed £73,925 for the weekend, placing ninth.

References

External links

1993 films
1990s science fiction comedy films
1990s sex comedy films
British science fiction films
British sex comedy films
Cultural depictions of Giacomo Casanova
Depictions of Genghis Khan on film
Dracula films
1990s English-language films
Films about Henry VIII
Films about misogyny
Films about time travel
Films set in the 23rd century
Fourth Doctor stories
1993 comedy films
1990s British films